The Convincer is a 2001 studio album by British singer-songwriter Nick Lowe. Produced by Lowe and Neil Brockbank, it was released in Europe by Proper Records and by Yep Roc Records in the United States.

Track listing
All songs by Nick Lowe, except where noted.
"Homewrecker"
"Only a Fool Breaks His Own Heart" (Norman Bergen, Shelly Coburn)
"Lately I've Let Things Slide"
"She's Got Soul"
"Cupid Must Be Angry"
"Indian Queens"
"Poor Side of Town" (Johnny Rivers, Lou Adler)
"I'm a Mess"
"Between Dark and Dawn"
"Bygones (Won't Go)"
"Has She Got a Friend?"
"Let's Stay In and Make Love"

Copies of the album sold by Borders Books and Music included a 3-inch bonus CD-EP :
"There Will Never Be Any Peace (Until God Is Seated at the Conference Table)" (Eugene Record, Barbara Acklin)
"Different Kind of Blue"
"Mama Said" (Luther Dixon, Willie Denson)

Personnel
Nick Lowe – rhythm guitar, bass guitar, vocals
Geraint Watkins – organ, piano
Robert Treherne – drums
Steve Donnelly – lead guitar

References

External links
 

2001 albums
Nick Lowe albums
Albums produced by Nick Lowe
Proper Records albums
Yep Roc Records albums